Culloden may refer to any of the following:

Geography

Canada
 Culloden, Nova Scotia, a small community in Digby County
 Culloden, Ontario, a village in the township of South-West Oxford
 Culloden, Prince Edward Island, a settlement in  Queens County

United Kingdom
 Culloden, Highland, a village in Scotland, near Inverness

United States
 Culloden, Georgia, a city in Monroe County
 Culloden, West Virginia, a census-designated place in Cabell and Putnam counties

Historical events
 Battle of Culloden, a battle which took place in Scotland in 1746, ending the last Jacobite Rising

Institutions
 Culloden Academy, a secondary school in Scotland

People
 Baron Culloden, a royal barony in the peerage of the United Kingdom
 Xan Windsor, Lord Culloden (b. 2007), an infant relative of the British Royal family, son of the Earl of Ulster and grandson of the Duke of Gloucester

Popular culture
 Culloden (film), a fictional presentation of the Battle of Culloden

Ships
 HMS Culloden, the name of several former ships of the Royal Navy